The NAMM Show is an annual event in the United States that is organized by the National Association of Music Merchants (NAMM), who describe it as "the industry’s largest stage, uniting the global music, sound and entertainment technology communities".

Overview 
The NAMM Show takes place annually in Anaheim, California, at the Anaheim Convention Center, and is one of the largest music product trade shows in the world. Its European counterpart is the Musikmesse in Frankfurt. The event attracts numerous famous musicians, many of whom are endorsed by exhibitors and come to promote their own signature models and equipment.

NAMM is a trade-only business show catering to domestic and international dealers and distributors. The product exhibits are an integral part of the show, allowing the dealers and distributors to see what's new, negotiate deals and plan their purchasing for the next 6 to 12 months. Exhibitors are allotted a specific number of attendees based on the size of their booth. Retail Members are allowed a certain number of attendees based on their full-time employees.

Summer NAMM 
The association's former other show, Summer NAMM, took place in the summer in Nashville, Tennessee, at the newly constructed Music City Center. Summer NAMM was about one-quarter the size of the NAMM Show in January and focuses more on industry meetings and professional development rather than products.

History 
In 1901, 52 members of the National Piano Manufacturers Association of America formed the National Association of Piano Dealers of America. The group held its first annual meeting in 1904. In 1919, the group renamed itself National Association of Music Merchants, or NAMM.

NAMM has evolved from a national retail association into an international association whose members now include commercial companies, distributors, affiliates and manufacturers.

The NAMM Show did not take place in 1932, 1934, 1942 or 1945. Due to the COVID-19 pandemic, the 2022 NAMM Show was held in Anaheim June 3–5, 2022, with no separate Summer NAMM to be held.

2021: Believe in Music Week 
As was announced on August 10, 2020, due to the COVID-19 pandemic, the in-person 2021 NAMM Show was not held as planned on January 21–24, 2021 in Anaheim, California. Rather, NAMM hosted the Believe in Music Week starting January 18, 2021 which featured "a mix of comprehensive programming and professional education at BelieveinMusic.tv, as well as an interactive marketplace to connect buyers and sellers – all designed to elevate the innovation and inspiration found across the industry while offering support for those most deeply affected by COVID. While not The NAMM Show or a virtual tradeshow, the initiative will meet the immediate business needs of NAMM member companies through thought-leader led education for all segments of the industry, networking and AI matchmaking, and business-to-business-focused opportunities to reaffirm and grow business connections, launch new products, share brand initiatives and engage with customers in real-time."

2022 
The NAMM Show returned as an in-person event in Anaheim, California from Friday, June 3 through Sunday, June 5, 2022.

2023 
The NAMM Show is scheduled to return to the Anaheim Convention Center from Thursday, April 13 to Saturday, April 15, 2023.

She Rocks Awards at the NAMM Show 
She Rocks Awards was created by the Women's International Music Network to pay tribute to women working the music industry. It was founded in 2012 by Laura B. Whitmore. The awards are a gala celebration and are held during the NAMM Show. It is currently held at the House of Blues, Anaheim with attendance nearing 800 and selling out many years. Honorees include major musicians to behind-the-scenes professionals. The Awards are known for celebrating women's achievements throughout the music industry.

2022 Honorees 

 Dionne Warwick
 Meredith Brooks
 Milck
 Yvette Young
 Lyndsey Parker
 Carmen Vandenberg
 Julie Robbins
 Sherri Chung
 Leslie Gaston-Bird
 EveAnna Manley
 Kerry Fiero

2019 Honorees 
Lifetime Achievement Award: Janis Joplin (new award in 2019)

 Terri Nunn (Icon award)
 Macy Gray
 Lisa Loeb
 Nita Strauss
 Erika Ender
 Dana DuFine, AEG Facilities (Powerhouse award)
 Dale Krevens, Tech 21 (Mad Skills award)
 Lynette Sage, Reverb (Innovator award)
 Samantha Pink, JAM Industries USA (Excellence Award)
 Terri Winston, Women’s Audio Mission

2018 Honorees 

 Melissa Ethridge
 Kate Pierson & Cindy Wilson (B-52s)
 Karla Redding-Andrews, The Otis Redding Foundation
 Exene Cervenka, vocalist for X (punk band)
 Amberly Crouse-Knox, BMG Production Music
 The members of the band Fanny (Jean Millington Adamian, June Millington, Brie Darling, Patti Quatro, Alice de Buhr)
 Candace Stewart, EastWest Studios
 Dawn Birr, Sennheiser Business Solutions 
 Fabi Reyna, She Shreds Media
 Vanessa Mering, HARMAN Professional
 Kristy Porter, Guitar Center

2017 Honorees 

 Monique Boyer, M.A.C. Cosmetics
 Rebecca Eaddy, Roland Corporation U.S.
 Lita Ford
 Beverly Fowler, PRS Guitars
 Lisa Foxx, iHeartRadio network
 Charyn Harris, A Place Called Home
Karrie Keyes, SoundGirls, sound engineer for Pearl Jam
 Tracy Leenman, Musical Innovations
 Dani Markman, Disney Music Group
 Shirley Manson
Esperanza Spalding
 Leanne Summers, LAWIM (Los Angeles Women in Music)

2016 Honorees 

 Chaka Khan
 Jennifer Batten
 Amy Heidemann, Karmin
 Leslie Ann Jones, Skywalker Sound
 Mindy Abovitz, Tom Tom Magazine 
 Mona Tavakoli & Becky Gebhardt, Rock Camp For Girls L.A. and Raining Jane
 Chalise Zolezzi, Taylor Guitars
 Cathy Carter Duncan, Seymour Duncan
 Crystal Morris, Gator Cases
 Pamela Cole & Leigh Maples, Fanny’s House of Music
 Mary Luehrsen, NAMM
 Sujata Murthy, Universal Music Enterprises

2015 Honorees 

 The Bangles
 Colbie Caillat
 Mindi Abair
 Amani Duncan, Martin Guitar
 Craigie Zildjian, Zildjian
 Paula Salvatore, Capitol Records

See also 
 TEC Awards: Awarded during the NAMM Show
 NAMM Oral History Program

References

External links

Trade shows in the United States
Culture of Anaheim, California
Music conferences
Recurring events established in 1901
1901 establishments in California
Festivals established in 1901